Westland is a municipality in the western Netherlands, in the province of South Holland.

Towns and other settlements: De Lier, 's-Gravenzande, Monster, Naaldwijk, Wateringen, Heenweg, Honselersdijk, Kwintsheul, Maasdijk, Poeldijk, and Ter Heijde.

History
Westland was created on 1 January 2004 by a merger of the municipalities De Lier, 's-Gravenzande, Monster, Naaldwijk and Wateringen. These are also the names of five of the settlements. The others are Heenweg, Honselersdijk, Kwintsheul, Maasdijk, Poeldijk, and Ter Heijde. Westland itself is not the name of a settlement or town, but rather of the region. The City hall is located in the middle of Westland, in Naaldwijk, the second largest settlement in Westland.

The town of Honselersdijk also possesses the largest Flower Auction, FloraHolland, which also has a location in Rijnsburg. This is a very important sector of the Westland economy. Flowers produced in Westland are sold all over the world.

Coastal towns are Ter Heijde (near Monster), Monster itself and 's-Gravenzande. These towns are popular with Germans and people from the Eastern Netherlands. It is not unknown for every holiday campsite to be fully booked with tourists because of their relative proximity to the more popular Scheveningen.

Wider area

Westland is part of the Haaglanden conurbation.

In a wider sense, Westland is also the name of the region south-west of the line The Hague - Delft - Rotterdam, approximately consisting of the municipalities Westland and Midden-Delfland, as well as Hook of Holland (municipality of Rotterdam).

Westland is most known for its horticulture in greenhouses, growing flowers and vegetables.

Notable people 

 Martinus Dorpius (1485 in Naaldwijk – 1525) a humanist, friend and correspondent of Erasmus 
 Arnold Vinnius (1588 in Monster – 1657) a leading jurist
 Franco Burgersdijk (1590 in De Lier – 1635) a Dutch logician 
 Maria Ponderus (1672 in Monster – 1764), an art collector and hofje founder
 Gerrit van Poelje (1884 in Maasdijk – 1976) a Dutch civil servant, lawyer and Public Administration scholar
 Peter Van de Wetering (1931 in Naaldwijk – 2014) an American horticulturist and nurseryman
 Huub Kortekaas (born 1935 in 's-Gravenzande) a Dutch sculptor
 Rein Welschen (1941–2013) Dutch politician, acting Mayor of Westland in 2014
 Hans Strikwerda (born 1952 in Naaldwijk) a Dutch organizational theorist and academic 
 Marc Lankhorst (born 1968 in Naaldwijk) a Dutch computer scientist, researcher and consultant, works on enterprise architecture and ArchiMate 
 Anneliese Van Der Pol (born 1984 in Naaldwijk) a Dutch-American actress and singer

Sport 
 Cornelis van Dalen (1885 in Monster – 1953) a Dutch sports shooter, competed at the 1920 Summer Olympics
 Hans Houtzager (1910 in Honselersdijk – 1993) a Dutch hammer thrower, competed at the 1936 and 1948 Summer Olympics
 Wim van der Voort (1923 in 's-Gravenzande – 2016) a Dutch speed skater, silver medalist at the 1952 Summer Olympics
 Kees Broekman (1927 in De Lier – 1992) a Dutch former speed skater, silver medalist at the 1952 Summer Olympics
 Leo van Vliet (born 1955 in Honselersdijk) a former professional racing cyclist
 Gerrit Solleveld (born 1961 in De Lier) a former Dutch professional road bicycle racer
 Menno Boelsma (born 1961 in Monster) a retired speed skater, competed at the 1988 Winter Olympics
 Patrick van der Meer (born 1971 in Wateringen) a Dutch dressage rider, competed at the 2012 Summer Olympics
 Marinus Dijkhuizen (born 1972 in 's-Gravenzande) a Dutch football manager, coach and former player with 365 club caps
 Oscar Moens (born 1973 in 's-Gravenzande) a former Dutch footballer with 401 club caps
 Guus Vogels (born 1975 in Naaldwijk) a Dutch field hockey goalkeeper, gold medallist at the 1966 and 2000 Summer Olympics
 Stefan Aartsen (born 1975 in 's-Gravenzande) a former butterfly swimmer, competed at the 1996 and 2000 Summer Olympics
 Ricardo van der Ende (born 1979 in Poeldijk) a Dutch racing driver
 Martine Zuiderwijk (born 1984 in Naaldwijk) a Dutch former figure skater
 Johan Voskamp (born 1984 in De Lier) a Dutch footballer with over 280 club caps
 Mandy Mulder (born 1987 in Poeldijk) a sailor, competed at the 2008 Summer Olympics 
 Thiemo de Bakker (born 1988 in 's-Gravenzande) a Dutch tennis player
 Mandy van den Berg (born 1990 in Naaldwijk) a Dutch football defender
 Arantxa Rus (born 1990) a Dutch tennis player, lives in Monster 
 Kiki Bertens (born 1991 in Wateringen) a Dutch tennis player
 Lara van Ruijven (born 1992 in Naaldwijk - 2020) a Dutch short track speed skater

References

External links

 Official website

 
Municipalities of South Holland
Municipalities of the Netherlands established in 2004